is the second novel by Japanese author Yukio Mishima. First published on 5 July 1949 by Kawade Shobō, it launched him to national fame though he was only in his early twenties. Some have posited that Mishima's similarities to the main character of the novel come from the character acting as a stand-in for Mishima's own autobiographical story.

Plot
The protagonist is referred to in the story as Kochan, which is the diminutive of the author's real name: Kimitake. Being raised during Japan's era of right-wing militarism and Imperialism, he struggles from a very early age to fit into society. Like Mishima, Kochan was born with a less-than-ideal body in terms of physical fitness and robustness, and throughout the first half of the book (which generally details Kochan's childhood) struggles intensely to fit into Japanese society. A weak homosexual, Kochan is kept away from boys his own age as he is raised, and is thus not exposed to the norm. His isolation likely led to his future fascinations and fantasies of death, violence, and same-sex intercourse.

Kochan is homosexual, and in the context of Imperial Japan he struggles to keep it to himself. In the early portion of the novel, Kochan does not yet openly admit that he is attracted to men, but indeed professes that he admires masculinity and strength while having no interest in women. This includes an admiration for Roman sculptures and statues of men in dynamic physical positions. Some have argued that the admiration of masculinity is autobiographical of Mishima, himself having worked hard through a naturally weak body to become a superbly fit body builder and male model.

In the first chapter of the book, Kochan recalls a memory of a picture book from when he was four years old. Even at that young age, Kochan approached a single picture of a heroic-looking European knight on horseback almost as pornography, gazing at it longingly and hiding it away, embarrassed, when others come to see what he is doing. When his nurse tells him that the knight is actually Joan of Arc, Kochan, wanting the knight to be a paragon of manliness, is immediately and forever put off by the picture, annoyed that a woman would dress in man's clothing.

The word 'mask' comes from how Kochan develops his own false personality that he uses to present himself to the world. Early on, as he develops a fascination with his friend Omi's body during puberty, he believes that everybody around him is also hiding their true feelings from each other, everybody participating in a 'reluctant masquerade'. As he grows up, he tries to fall in love with a girl named Sonoko, but is continuously tormented by his latent homosexual urges, and is unable to ever truly love her.

References

1949 novels
1949 Japanese novels
Japanese-language novels
Novels by Yukio Mishima
Novels set in Tokyo
Novels with gay themes
1940s LGBT novels
Japanese LGBT novels
1949 debut novels
Kawade Shobō Shinsha books
Novels set in Nagano Prefecture